

Events

January events
 January 13 – Union Pacific Railroad’s City of San Francisco is stalled in snow on Donner Pass. The train's passengers remain stranded in the train until January 16.

March events 
 March 25 – The Seibu Shinjuku Line extension from Takadanobaba to Seibu-Shinjuku Station opens.

April events
 April 14 – Indian Railways divisional organisation completed by formation of the Eastern Railway, created by amalgamating three lower divisions of the East Indian Railway (Howrah, Asansol and Danapur), the entire Bengal Nagpur Railway and the Sealdah division of the erstwhile Bengal Assam Railway; the Northern Railway, created from remaining divisions of the EIR, the Eastern Punjab Railway and others; and the North Eastern Railway created by merger of the Oudh and Tirhut Railway and the Assam Railway.

May events 
 May 3 – Wallace station on the Chicago "L" Stock Yards branch is closed.
 May 4 – Service is discontinued on the Chicago "L" Humboldt Park branch.

July events
 July 6 – The last tram (streetcar) runs in London, England.
 July 21 – The 7.3  Kern County earthquake strikes Southern California with a maximum Mercalli intensity of XI (Extreme), killing 12 and injuring hundreds.

August events
 August 2 – The Buffalo-Exchange Street Station opens.

September events
 September 6 – The Chesapeake and Ohio Railroad car ferry Badger is launched. It is the last coal-fired, passenger-carrying steamship built in the United States, and it is still in use for automobile travel.

October events
 October 4 – Brussels-Congress railway station is opened.
 October 8 – Three trains are involved in the Harrow and Wealdstone rail crash in England, a crash that kills 112 and injures 340.
 October 17 – British Railways initiates trial of a new Automatic Warning System (Automatic Train Control).

November events
 November 1 – The Pacific Great Eastern Railway opens its branch from Quesnel, British Columbia, to a nearby junction with the Canadian National Railway.
 November 20 – Brush Bagnall (England) formally hand over first of batch of class M1 A1A-A1A diesel-electric locomotives for Ceylon Government Railway, its first mainline diesels.

December events
 December 1 – Canadian Pacific Railway ushers in the modern intermodal freight transport era with the introduction of Trailer On Flat Car service.
 December 28 – Pacific Electric discontinues interurban service over the Cahuenga Pass between Los Angeles and Van Nuys, California.

Unknown date events
 The "Chinese Changchun Railway", that portion of the Chinese Eastern Railway on the Liaodong Peninsula, is returned by the Soviet Union to Chinese control.
 National Railway Company of Belgium opens new Brussels-North railway station.
 Last standard gauge compound locomotives built: Norfolk and Western Railway 2-8-8-2 Class Y6b Mallet #2200 from its Roanoke Shops, the last conventional steam freight locomotive for road service constructed in the United States; and SNCF Class 241P mixed-traffic 4-cylinder Chapelon 4-8-2 #241P-35 at Le Creusot in France.
 Donald J. Russell takes over as president of the Southern Pacific Company, parent company of the Southern Pacific Railroad.

Accidents

Births
 September 19 – George Warrington, president of Amtrak 1998–2002, executive director of New Jersey Transit 2002–2007 (d. 2007).

Deaths
 November 19 – Yury Lomonosov, Russian-born locomotive engineer (b. 1876).

References